Eugene Wu (born 1945) is a Taiwanese business executive. He led the Shin Kong Group and several affiliated subsidiaries.

Early life
Eugene's eldest sister is Wu Ju-yueh.

Wu earned a bachelor's degree from Waseda University.

Career
After his father's death in 1986, Eugene Wu assumed control of several of his father's holdings. Eugene partnered with construction magnate James Lin to build many buildings owned by the Shin Kong Group. In June 2002, Thomas Wu proposed a merger between his Taishin Financial Holdings and Eugene's Shin Kong Financial Holding. After eight days of formal consideration, Thomas withdrew the offer. In August 2005, Eugene was indicted by the Taipei District Prosecutors' Office on charges of insider trading, a violation of the Securities and Exchange Law related to the failed merger of 2002. That October, Shin Kong Financial completed a merger with Macoto Bank to form . That same year, Wu was targeted by the Financial Holding Company Act announced by the Financial Supervisory Commission, which made it illegal for top executives at financial holding companies to hold equivalent leadership positions at other non-financial businesses. In 2006, Wu expressed an interest in forming a partnership with a financial institution that had international reach. Later that year, Wu's  increased its investment in Shin Kong Bank. Wu also considered acquiring . Notable investments include office space in the Neihu Science Park and in London. Eugene Wu announced in June 2020 that he was stepping down from his position as chair of Shin Kong Financial. Wu was suspended from his post as chairman of Shin Kong Life Insurance on 15 September 2020, by the Financial Supervisory Commission. The company was fined for a reckless investment, and Wu was suspended for poor supervision. Wu is not permitted to rejoin the company board until his current term ends in June 2023.

Personal life
Wu has spoken favorably regarding the economic influence of China on Taiwan. He attended an annual forum organized by China's Taiwan Affairs Office in 2004. Wu has served the Formosa Foundation as a board member and the General Association of Chinese Culture as an executive member.

Fortune valued Wu's net worth at $1.8 billion in 1992. Wu was ranked on Forbes list of Taiwanese billionaires in 2006, with a net worth of $1.9 billion. By 2008, his net worth had risen to $2.3 billion, ranked eleventh. Forbes reported that Wu lost one billion of his net worth in the 2009 rankings, placing twelfth in Taiwan. In 2010, Wu's fortune was valued at $1.5 billion, and ranked fourteenth. The next year, according to Forbes, Wu's net worth had recovered to a total of $2.2 billion, and he was listed thirteenth on the list of Taiwanese billionaires. The 2017 Forbes rankings slid Wu to forty-first, with his fortune valued at $1.1 billion. The 2020 list ranked Wu the thirty-seventh richest Taiwanese billionaire, and valued his net worth at $1.2 billion.

Wu is married to Hsu Hsien-hsien, the daughter of banker and politician Hsu Sheng-fa. Wu and his wife raised three children. His eldest daughter, Cynthia Wu, married , an executive at Hua Nan Securities, in 2010. His middle child is Wu Hsin-ju. Wu's youngest child and only son is Wu Yi-tung.

Wu acquired the gorilla later named Bao Bao after he was smuggled to Taiwan in 1987, and donated the primate to the Taipei Zoo.

References

1945 births
Living people
20th-century Taiwanese businesspeople
21st-century Taiwanese businesspeople
Businesspeople in insurance
Taiwanese bankers
Taiwanese billionaires
Taiwanese business executives
Waseda University alumni